There are 21 three-thousanders (mountains with elevations of  or greater) in Japan.

Geography 
There are three-thousanders in the following regions:
 The independent peaks of Mount Fuji and Mount Ontake.
 In the Hida Mountains ("Northern Alps") are Mount Okuhotaka, Mount Yari, Mount Karasawa, Mount Kitahotaka, Mount Ōbami, Mount Maehotaka, Mount Naka, Mount Minami, Mount Norikura and Mount Tate.
 In the Akaishi Mountains ("Southern Alps") are Mount Kita, Mount Aino, Mount Warusawa, Mount Akaishi, Mount Arakawa, Mount Nishinōtori, Mount Shiomi, Mount Senjō and Mount Hijiri.

The Siberian dwarf pine belt is a key habitat of the rock ptarmigan.

21 mountains

References

See also 

 List of mountains in Japan
 100 Famous Japanese Mountains
 Hida Mountains, Chūbu-Sangaku National Park
 Akaishi Mountains, Minami Alps National Park

 
Mountains
Japan
Japan